Margrit Klinger (born 22 June 1960 in Obersuhl-Hönebach) is a retired West German middle-distance runner who specialized in the 800 metres.

Her personal best time in 800 metres is 1:57.22 minutes, achieved at the 1982 European Championships in Athens. This places her eighth on the German all-time list, behind Sigrun Wodars, Christine Wachtel, Elfi Zinn, Anita Weiß, Martina Kämpfert, Ulrike Klapezynski and Hildegard Ullrich. Her personal best time in 1500 metres is 4:02.66 minutes, achieved in August 1983 in Köln. This places her tenth on the German all-time list, behind Christiane Wartenberg, Hildegard Körner, Angelika Zauber, Andrea Lange, Ulrike Klapezynski, Beate Liebich, Kristina da Fonseca-Wollheim, Brigitte Kraus and Gunhild Hoffmeister.

Klinger competed for the sports club TV Obersuhl during her active career.

Achievements

References

1960 births
Living people
West German female middle-distance runners
Athletes (track and field) at the 1984 Summer Olympics
Olympic athletes of West Germany
European Athletics Championships medalists
Sportspeople from Kassel (region)
20th-century German women
21st-century German women
People from Hersfeld-Rotenburg